Beal's Green is a hamlet north of Hawkhurst in Kent, South East England.

Hamlets in Kent
Hawkhurst